The killing of Tim McLean occurred on the evening of 30 July 2008. On 5 March 2009, his killer, the 40-year-old Vincent Weiguang Li, was found not criminally responsible for murder and remanded to a high-security mental health facility in Selkirk, Manitoba, where he was detained until his release on 8 May 2015.

Incident
On July 30, 2008, Tim McLean, a carnival barker, was returning home to Winnipeg after working at a fair in Edmonton. He departed Edmonton on board Greyhound bus 1170 to Winnipeg, via the Yellowhead Highway through Saskatchewan. He sat at the rear, one row ahead of the toilet. At 6:55 p.m., the bus departed from a stop in Erickson, Manitoba, with a new passenger, Vince Weiguang Li. Li, described as a tall man in his 40s, with a shaved head and sunglasses, originally sat near the front of the bus, but moved to sit next to McLean following a scheduled rest stop. McLean "barely acknowledged" Li, then fell asleep against the window pane, headphones covering his ears.

According to witnesses, McLean was sleeping with his headphones on when the man sitting next to him suddenly produced a large knife and began stabbing him in the neck and chest. After the attack began, the bus driver pulled to the side of the road, and he and all the other passengers fled the vehicle. The driver and two other men made an attempt to rescue McLean, but were chased away by Li, who slashed at them from behind the locked bus doors. Li ultimately decapitated McLean and displayed his severed head to those standing outside the bus, then returned to McLean's body and began severing other parts and consuming some of McLean's flesh.

At 8:30 p.m., the Royal Canadian Mounted Police (RCMP) in Portage la Prairie received a report of a stabbing on a Greyhound bus west of the city. They arrived to find the suspect still on board the bus, being prevented from escaping by another passenger, the bus driver, and a truck driver who had provided a crowbar and a hammer as weapons. The other passengers were huddled at the roadside, some of them crying and vomiting. As the suspect had earlier attempted to escape by driving the bus away, the driver had engaged the emergency immobiliser system, rendering the vehicle inoperable. Witnesses had observed the suspect stabbing and cutting McLean's body with a knife, and carrying McLean's severed head.

By 9:00 p.m., police were in a standoff with the suspect and had summoned special negotiators and a heavily armed tactical unit. The suspect alternately paced the length of the bus and defiled the corpse. Police officers then observed Li eating parts of the body. Meanwhile, the stranded passengers were transported from the scene to be interviewed at the Brandon RCMP detachment. RCMP officers reportedly heard Li say, "I have to stay on the bus forever."

On July 31, 2008, at 1:30 a.m., the suspect attempted to escape from the bus by breaking through a window. The RCMP arrested Li soon afterward. He was shot with a Taser twice, handcuffed and placed in the back of a police cruiser. Parts of the victim's body, placed in plastic bags, were retrieved from the bus, while his ear, nose and tongue were found in Li's pockets. The victim's eyes and a part of his heart were never recovered and are presumed to have been eaten by Li.

At 10:00 a.m., Greyhound representatives took the other passengers to a local store to replace their clothes, which remained on the bus. They arrived in Winnipeg at 3:30 p.m. that day, to be reunited with family members and friends.

Tim McLean 

Timothy Richard "Tim" McLean Jr., was born on October 3, 1985, in Winnipeg, Manitoba. He grew up both in Winnipeg and in Elie, Manitoba. He was 22 years old when he was killed on July 30, 2008. At the time of his death, McLean had been working as a carnival worker, specifically a carnival barker in Edmonton, Alberta. On December 21, 2008, five months after McLean’s death, his son was born.

Vince Li

Background

Vincent Weiguang "Vince" Li was born in Dandong, Liaoning, on April 30, 1968. In 1992, Li graduated from Wuhan Institute of Technology with a bachelor's degree in computing. From 1994 to 1998, Li worked in Beijing as a computer software engineer. Li immigrated to Canada on June 11, 2001 (though some newspapers mistakenly reported 2004), and became a Canadian citizen on November 7, 2006. Psychiatrist Stanley Yaren, who later examined Li, said Li was hospitalized in 2003 or 2004 after an incident with the Ontario Provincial Police.

He worked in Winnipeg at menial jobs at Grant Memorial Church for six months to support his wife, Anna. Pastor Tom Castor, who employed Li, said he seemed happy to have a job and was committed to doing it well, despite a language barrier with other congregation members.

"I think he would occasionally feel frustrated with not being able to communicate or understand," Castor told CTV Winnipeg. "But we have very patient staff members and he seemed to respond well." Castor also said Li did not show any signs of anger issues or any other trouble before he quit in the spring of 2005. He worked as a forklift operator in Winnipeg while his wife worked as a waitress.

Li first moved to Edmonton in 2006, abruptly leaving his wife alone in Winnipeg until she joined him later. His jobs included service at a Wal-Mart, at a McDonald's restaurant, and newspaper delivery. His delivery boss, Vincent Augert, described Li as reliable, hard-working and not showing any signs of trouble.

Four weeks before the killing, he was fired from Wal-Mart following a "disagreement" with other employees. Shortly before the incident, Li asked for time off from his delivery job to go to Winnipeg for a job interview.

July 29, 2008
At 12:05 p.m. on July 28 in Edmonton, Li boarded a Greyhound bus bound for Winnipeg. On July 29, around 6 p.m., Li got off the bus in Erickson, Manitoba, with at least three pieces of luggage, and stayed the night on a bench next to a grocery store. According to one witness, he was seen at 3 a.m. sitting bolt upright with eyes wide open. On the morning of July 30, still at the bench, he sold his new laptop computer to a 15-year-old boy for $60. The laptop was seized by the RCMP as evidence; the boy was subsequently given a new laptop for his honesty by an anonymous businessman.

Witness Garnet Caton said the attacker seemed oblivious to others when the stabbing occurred, adding he was struck by Li's calm demeanour. "There was no rage or anything. He was like a robot, stabbing the guy," he said. When he appeared in a Portage la Prairie courthouse on charges of second-degree murder, the only words Li reportedly uttered were pleas for someone to kill him.

Trial
Li's trial commenced on March 3, 2009, with Li pleading not criminally responsible on account of mental disorder. This means he accepted that the offence occurred but claimed that he was unable to form the necessary mental element or mens rea. The psychiatrist said that Li performed the attack because he was hearing voices he believed were from God, telling him to destroy the demon sitting beside him, or he would be killed himself.  The presiding judge, John Scurfield, accepted the diagnosis, and ruled that Li was not criminally responsible for the killing. Li was remanded to the Selkirk Mental Health Centre.

Aftermath
The week following the attack, Greyhound Canada announced it was pulling a series of nationwide advertisements which included the slogan, "There's a reason you've never heard of bus rage." The incident has led to numerous calls and petitions demanding increased security on intercity buses.

The family of Tim McLean have brought a lawsuit of $150,000 against Greyhound, the Attorney General of Canada, and Vince Li.
On June 3, 2010, Li was granted supervised outdoor walks within his mental health facility as voted by the provincial review board.
On February 16, 2011, two passengers, Debra Tucker and Kayli Shaw, filed a lawsuit against Li, Greyhound, the RCMP, and the Canadian government for being exposed to the beheading. They were each seeking $3 million in damages. On July 14, 2015, the two women dropped their lawsuit.
On May 30, 2011, CBC reported that Li was responding well to his psychiatric treatment and that his doctor had recommended that he receive more freedoms, phased in over several months.
On May 17, 2012, the National Post reported that Li had been granted temporary passes that would allow him out of the Selkirk Mental Health Centre for visits to the town of Selkirk, supervised by a nurse and peace officer. In an interview, Li spoke for the first time, saying that he began hearing "the voice of God" in 2004 and that he wanted to save the people from an alien attack.
On February 27, 2014, CBC reported that on March 6, Li would be allowed to have unsupervised visits to Selkirk, starting at 30 minutes and expanding to full-day trips. Since 2013, he had been allowed to have supervised visits to Lockport, Winnipeg, and nearby beaches. Those visits were then relaxed.
On July 17, 2014, the Toronto Sun reported that one of the first officers on the scene, Corporal Ken Barker of the RCMP, had committed suicide. The family stated in his obituary that he had posttraumatic stress disorder.
On February 27, 2015, CBC News reported that Li was given unsupervised day passes to visit Winnipeg so long as he carried a functioning cellular telephone while using them.
On May 8, 2015, CTV News reported that Li would be granted passes to group homes in the community.
In February 2016, it was reported that Li had legally changed his name to Will Lee Baker and was seeking to leave his group home to live independently. He won the right to live alone on February 26 upon the recommendation of the Criminal Code Review Board.

On February 10, 2017, the Manitoba Criminal Code Review Board ordered Li be discharged. Li was granted an absolute discharge. There will be no legal obligations or restrictions pertaining to Li's independent living.

Further reading
Vincent (Cider Press, 2015), a book-length poem by American poet Joseph Fasano, is a fictionalized work based loosely on the event.

See also
List of incidents of cannibalism
2001 Greyhound bus attack
Murder of Yang Xin

References

2008 in Manitoba
Incidents of cannibalism
Intercity bus incidents
Bus incidents in Canada
Greyhound Lines
Deaths by stabbing in Canada
Deaths by decapitation
2008 crimes in Canada